Cyana ruwenzoriana is a moth of the family Erebidae. It was described by Timm Karisch in 2003 and is endemic to Uganda.

References

ruwenzoriana
Moths described in 2003
Endemic fauna of Uganda
Insects of Uganda
Moths of Africa